Oryzeae is a tribe of flowering plants in the true grass family, Poaceae. It contains 11 genera, including both cultivated rice (Oryza) and wild rice (Zizania).

Genera
There are 11 genera classified in two subtribes:

References

External links

Oryzoideae
Poaceae tribes